Cambuquira is a Brazilian municipality in the State of Minas Gerais, Brazil.
It has approximately 12,812 inhabitants (2020 estimate), and the city is part of the Circuito das Águas ("Water Circuit") of Minas Gerais.

History
About its origin, it is said that there was a Farm (Boa Vista Farm), which headquarters was at the Plaza of São Francisco. It belonged to three sisters called Ana, Joana and Francisca da Silva Goulart. When they died, they left the farm as inheritance for their ancient slaves, as they didn't have heirs. Soon, its mineral waters were discovered, attracting people in search of cures attributed to them.
In 1861, the city council of Campanha, dispossessed the lands, considering them as public utility. The place was set free to visitation, what allowed the development of the town in the outskirts.
In 1872, the "Arraial de Cambuquira" was established/erected in the district of Campanha.
In 1894, the Minas and Rio Railroad was inaugurated and the city started to be populated.

Cambuquira was decreed (Decree #2528) on May 12, 1911, and its first mayor was Dr. Raul de Noronha Sá.

In the following decades, the tourism grew up in the rhythm of the other ranches, until it was officially declared as a "Hydromineral Ranch", in 1970.

Cities of the "Water Circuit": (Lambari, São Lourenço, Cambuquira, Caxambu)

Tourist attractions

Parque das Águas (City Water Park)
Cambuquira is considered the cradle of the best water in Brazil (and in the Americas!), as Vip Exames's research (Abril publishing) of 1997, occupying the second place in general classification of the world's mineral waters, just behind the Ty Nant (Welsh's famous mineral water).

This park has five different fountains, with therapeutic purposes:
 Gaseous Water (Regina Werneck): acute and chronic nephritis, diuresis, gastric movements and secretion stimulating, gastritis, hepatitis, inflammation in biliary channels, intestinal diseases, enteritis, nervous system diseases, dermatosis, eczemas.
 Gaseous Water with Lithium (Roxo Rodrigues): the same therapeutic properties of Regina Werneck's spring, but still indicated for emotional disturbances.
 Water with Magnesium (Comendador Augusto Ferreira): renal function stimulating. Helps with the treatment of hyperuricemia, rheumatism, lithiasis (calculus formation), colitis, pyelitis and nephritis.
 Sulfureous (Dr. Sousa Lima): diuresis, when drunk in fasting; colitis, gastritis, acidity, bowel movements stimulating.
 Ferrous (Dr. Fernandes Pinheiro): anemia, lymphatism.

The park still has a spa with hydrotherapy and physiotherapy, besides it has gardens, playgrounds and a lake with pedalo boats.

Enclosed to the park there is a magnificent wood, where tracks allow to the walker to have direct contact with native fauna and flora.

Parque do Marimbeiro (Marimbeiro’s Water Park)
Two kilometers away from the center of the city, this park has six springs that are indicated to cases of digestive system diseases, colitis, lithiasis and hepatic diseases.

Igreja Matriz de São Sebastião (Saint Sebastian Church)
This church was constructed by Antônio Joaquim da Silva Lemos, José Vicente da Silva, Casimiro José da Costa, Thomé da Silva Lemos, Manoel Martins e José Martins at 1920 and its inauguration was at 1925.

With big extension, its churchyard is enlightened by lamps and has gardened isles. On its facade, there are two towers with bells, both with inclinables, spyglass and window. It has a front door cushioned and worked, above it there's a big stained glass window and clock.

In its interior, there's a choir with a parapet. Its nave is simple with ceramic pavement, ceiling with wood laths, stained glass windows and four side doors, with colored draws. The main altar is simple, and there's a Saint Sebastian sculpture. At the edges there are two shrines turned to the nave. At the bottom, there's the sacristy.

Someone can arrive there leaving the Bandeira's Plaza, through the Virgílio de Melo Franco Avenue (“Rua Direita”) and turn on the Marechal Deodoro Avenue.

Vale do Sol (Sun’s Valley)
It's an observatory on the border of the dirt road that leads to the Congonhal village. A curious tree with a twisted trunk determinates the best point that someone can have a splendid sunset view. The same road leads to the Congonhal cascade, a sequence of little falls and natural wells.

Alto do Cruzeiro (Cruzeiro’s High)
Also called Santa Quitéria's High. It has 1,114 meters of altitude, providing a nice view of the whole city and of the coffee plantations. At the right, someone can see the city of São Thomé das Letras. In this place there's a great cross.

Pico do Piripau (Piripau’s Peak)
It is located at the Serra das Águas and it has 1,372 meters of altitude. In this place there's a marvelous view of the cities of Cambuquira, São Thomé das Letras, Três Corações and Lambari, besides many farms and coffee plantations.

At the peak, there's the Hang-Gliding's North Ramp of Cambuquira. It is 400 meters of fall, natural takeoff for three gliders, simultaneously, and a vast area for equipment hookup. The best season for flying is from August to November.

Cambuquira bases the Hang-Gliding's Cambuquira's Club (CVLC - Clube de Vôo Livre de Cambuquira), that is a civilian fellowship, with no profitable purposes, with cultural and educational goals, and, especially, the encouragement of hang-gliding in Cambuquira and region. The club was funded on November, 1997.

One can arrive there taking the road to Caxambu, entering the dirt road beside the Lua Luana Inn.

Waterfalls
 Salto das Sete Cachoeiras,
 Cascata do Congonhal (3 km),
 da Usina (18 km),
 São Bento, e
 do Hilton.

Observatório Centauro (Centauro Observatory)
The Study Center of Astronomy was funded at 1961 and it serves the astronomy lovers and local schools.

Rivers
Lambari, Lambarizinho e São Bento.

Patron Saint
Saint Sebastian (20 January)

Old Names
 São Sebastião de Cambuquira, e
 Águas Virtuosas de Cambuquira.

References

External links
 Some old photos 
Cambuquira's Chamber

Municipalities in Minas Gerais